Edward George White (21 August 1910 – 1994) was a British composer of light music, whose compositions including "The Runaway Rocking-Horse" (1946), "Paris Interlude" (1952), "Puffin' Billy" (1952) and the signature tune for The Telegoons (1963), became familiar as radio and television theme tunes.

White was born in London, England, and was largely self-taught. He became a violinist in a trio and various dance bands, performing also on saxophone and clarinet. He became known as an arranger of music and, after service in the RAF during World War II, he ran a ballroom orchestra at the Grand Spa Hotel in Bristol. In 1961, the first stereophonic single ever released in the UK, was billed as 'The Sound of Ed White', playing "Coral Reef" and "Tropical Blue".  This was released by Pye Records.

"Puffin' Billy"
"Puffin' Billy" (1952) is perhaps his most familiar composition, especially in the original recording by Hubert Clifford and the Melodi Light Orchestra. The piece was inspired by an old steam locomotive called "Puffing Billy", (not the locomotive in the London Science Museum) seen by the composer while on holiday on the Isle of Wight. The piece was used as the signature tune for the BBC Light Programme's Children's Favourites, a radio request programme, from 1952 to 1966.

In the United States it was used for an even longer period of time (1955–1974) as the theme music to Captain Kangaroo on the CBS TV network. When a new theme song for Captain Kangaroo was used as "Good Morning, Captain", a portion of the "Puffing Billy" theme was used, played by strings, so that the theme trademark could live on through the next generations. In 1957, permission was granted for Mary Rodgers to write lyrics to the tune and the vocal version was given the title "Captain Kangaroo".

"Puffin' Billy" has often been used to signify 1950s Middle England, for example in The Comic Strip's parodies of The Famous Five, in some of the last cigar adverts on British TV in the early 1990s, and in a trailer for a 2004 Channel 4 documentary about anti-asylum-seeker demonstrators in Lee-on-the-Solent.

"Puffin' Billy" was featured in the Pixar short Tin Toy.

"The Runaway Rocking-Horse"
"The Runaway Rocking-Horse" (1946) was another White novelty tune used as the theme tune for the filmed U.S. television series Life with Buster Keaton (1951 - 1952).

References

External links
 

Light music composers
1910 births
1994 deaths
20th-century classical musicians
20th-century English composers